Lui Tuck Yew (born 16 August 1961) is a Singaporean diplomat, former politician and two-star rear-admiral who has been serving as Singapore Ambassador to China since 2019. He previously served as Singapore Ambassador to Japan between 2017 and 2019. 

A member of the governing People's Action Party (PAP), Lui served as the Member of Parliament (MP) representing the Moulmein ward of Tanjong Pagar GRC between 2006 and 2011 and later Moulmein–Kallang GRC between 2011 and 2015). He also served as Minister for Information, Communications and the Arts between 2009 and 2011, Minister for Transport between 2011 and 2015 and Second Minister for Defence in 2015 before retiring from politics. 

Prior to entering politics, Lui served in the Republic of Singapore Navy (RSN) and served as Chief of Navy between 1999 and 2003, holding the rank of two-star rear-admiral.

Education
Lui was educated at the Anglo-Chinese School (Primary), Anglo-Chinese School (Barker Road) and Anglo-Chinese Junior College, before he was awarded a Singapore Armed Forces Overseas Scholarship to study at the University of Cambridge, where he read the natural sciences tripos in Trinity College and graduated in 1983. 

He subsequently completed a Master of Arts degree in international relations at The Fletcher School of Law and Diplomacy at Tufts University in 1994.

Career
Lui began his career in the Republic of Singapore Navy (RSN) and became Chief of Navy in 1999. He left the RSN in 2003 to join the Administrative Service, and was appointed the chief executive officer of the Maritime and Port Authority (MPA). In 2004, he became the Deputy Secretary (Land) at the Ministry of Transport, while continuing to serve concurrently as the chief executive officer of the MPA. In 2005, Lui was appointed the chief executive officer of the Housing Development Board (HDB).

Political career
Lui made his political debut in the 2006 general election as part of a six-member PAP team contesting in Tanjong Pagar GRC and won. He was elected as the Member of Parliament (MP) for Tanjong Pagar GRC. During the 2011 general election, Lui switched to contesting in Moulmein–Kallang GRC and won. He was re-elected into Parliament.

Lui was appointed Minister of State for Education on 30 May 2006. On 1 April 2008, he became Senior Minister of State for Education and Senior Minister of State for Information, Communications and the Arts. He was appointed Acting Minister for Information, Communications and the Arts on 1 April 2009, and became a full member of the Cabinet in 2010 and was appointed Second Minister for Transport, assisting Raymond Lim.

After the 2011 general election, Lui was appointed Minister for Transport and Second Minister for Foreign Affairs. He relinquished his portfolio of Minister for Foreign Affairs on 1 August 2012, and remains the Minister for Transport.

During his tenure as Minister for Transport, Lui defended the privatisation of the public transport system, explaining that if public transport were to be nationalised, operators would be dependent on government funding as well as operate on a cost recovery basis. This he added, would not spur them to lower transport costs. Lui is adamant that the companies remain financially viable by approving yearly fare hikes.

2011 general election
During the 2011 general election, Lui contested in the newly created Moulmein–Kallang GRC and won 58.56% of the vote, against the Workers' Party.

On 11 August 2015, Lui announced his retirement from politics after serving for nine years. Together with former Cabinet ministers Wong Kan Seng, Mah Bow Tan and Raymond Lim, they stepped down from politics after the 2015 general election. 

Lui acknowledged the criticisms against him as a result of his management during his tenure as Minister for Transport, and said, "In politics, you need a tender heart and a thick skin, not a hard heart and thin skin. I think my heart, my skin, like all my body parts, are fine."

Diplomatic career
On 1 June 2017, the Ministry of Foreign Affairs appointed Lui Singapore Ambassador to Japan.

Lui was appointed Singapore Ambassador to China in November 2019.

Personal life
Lui is married to Soo Fen. They have two children.

References

External links

Profile at Cabinet of Singapore website
Profile at Parliament of Singapore website
Profile at Moulmein Constituency website

1961 births
Alumni of Trinity College, Cambridge
Anglo-Chinese School alumni
Anglo-Chinese Junior College alumni
Living people
Members of the Cabinet of Singapore
Members of the Parliament of Singapore
People's Action Party politicians
Ambassadors of Singapore to Japan
Singaporean people of Cantonese descent
The Fletcher School at Tufts University alumni
Chiefs of the Republic of Singapore Navy
Ministers for Transport of Singapore
Communications ministers of Singapore